Chouaib Bouloudinat (or Bouloudinats; born 8 January 1987, in Constantine) is an Algerian boxer who won the 2011 All-Africa Games and fought at the 2012 Olympics.

At the 2011 World Amateur Boxing Championships, he beat three opponents, then lost to Siarhei Karneyeu (BLR).

At the 2011 All-Africa Games, he won gold.

He easily won his Olympic qualifier but lost his first bout in London to Yamil Peralta, see results.

He qualified to represent Algeria at the 2020 Summer Olympics.

References

External links
 
 
 
 

1987 births
Living people
Heavyweight boxers
Boxers at the 2012 Summer Olympics
Boxers at the 2016 Summer Olympics
Olympic boxers of Algeria
Sportspeople from Constantine, Algeria
Algerian male boxers
Competitors at the 2019 African Games
African Games medalists in boxing
African Games competitors for Algeria
Boxers at the 2020 Summer Olympics
21st-century Algerian people
Mediterranean Games bronze medalists for Algeria
Competitors at the 2013 Mediterranean Games
Competitors at the 2022 Mediterranean Games
Mediterranean Games medalists in boxing
Competitors at the 2011 All-Africa Games
African Games gold medalists for Algeria